The Aero A.24 was a twin-engined biplane bomber aircraft of the 1920s. Flight tests showed it to be severely underpowered, making it useless as a combat aircraft. Only a single prototype was built.

Aero proposed a variant designated the A.27 that was to have overcome the A.24's shortcomings by re-engining the design with Bristol Jupiters, but the Czech Air Force was not interested in pursuing this option, and all development ceased.

Specifications (A.24)

See also

References

External links

A.24
Cancelled military aircraft projects
1920s Czechoslovakian bomber aircraft
Biplanes
Twin piston-engined tractor aircraft